Castelpetroso is a comune (municipality) in the Province of Isernia in the Italian region Molise, located about  west of Campobasso and about  southeast of Isernia.

Castelpetroso borders the following municipalities: Carpinone, Castelpizzuto, Pettoranello del Molise, Santa Maria del Molise.

Demographic evolution

References

Cities and towns in Molise